Josh Andres, known by his stage name STATIK LNK (formally Statik Link), is an American DJ, multi-instrumentalist, music producer, and songwriter. STATIK LNK produces sample packs and beats within the hip-hop genre. His music has been classified as a combination of jazz, hip-hop, soul music, and electro-funk sounds. As a producer and DJ, he defies genre norms by fusing together the sounds of jazz, soul, funk, electronic music, and hip-hop. STATIK LNK lists his primary influences as the music of Dr. Dre, Alchemist (musician), Robert Glasper, John Coltrane, J Dilla, Madlib, Miles Davis, and BadBadNotGood.

STATIK LNK was once an electronic duo. On December 2, 2016, STATIK LNK announced via their Facebook page that a long-time member, Dan Dwyer, was leaving the group. On January 6, 2020, Statik Link announced via Facebook post that he was changing his name from Statik Link to STATIK LNK. His reason for doing so is to "separate my old style (EDM, Trap, Dance) from new style (Jazzy, Soulful, Live Instrumentation) on Spotify, Apple Music, and Tidal. I'd like to remove a lot of my older music, but it's owned by smaller labels and am unable to take it off of my current Statik Link profile hence the new name. (16)"

Biography

Early life 
Joshua Andres was born in Zanesville, Ohio on January 3, 1987. He is the eldest of three children, including a sister, Kalee, and a brother, Matt. His parents, Tim and Kris, had no musical backgrounds. From the age of 3 until 18, Josh would live in the small city of Sandusky, Ohio. He attended Sandusky City Schools where he would learn to read and write music.

At the age of 5, Josh's dad, Tim, enrolled him in guitar lessons at Musician's Alley music store. He would then learn to read and write music. He attended guitar lessons until the age of 12, where he then switched to Trumpet. It is during his studying of the Trumpet, while at Sandusky City Schools, that he would learn Jazz Music. After his graduation in 2005, STATIK LNK would move to Toledo, Ohio, and attend the University of Toledo. At the University of Toledo, Josh would study Music Theory and Music Technology. During his studies, he was introduced to recording software, Pro Tools, which allowed him to arrange and compose music.

Early career 

After his graduation from the University of Toledo in 2009, Josh, pursued a career in hip-hop. While in Toledo, he met and began to produce records for Big J Tha White Wonder. While working with Big J, he placed his first major release with notable artists Emilio Rojas, and D-Black. During this time he began to travel to New York City frequently. During one of his trips to New York, Josh met EDM DJ/Producer MING (DIM MAK/Mau5trap/Hood Famous) through a mutual producer while working on a project at New York City recording studio Stadium Red. Following their meeting, Josh developed a business partnership with Ming (DJ), which involved shopping musical works to commercial television companies. It was during a meeting in 2011 that MING introduced Josh to EDM Bass Music. In an interview with Urban Hit Promotions, Magazine Josh is quoted "I thought Electronic Music was only Techno and House, which I respected, but was never a big fan of." [2] Josh goes on to say that MING's introduction to Dubstep was the moment that Josh made the switch from hip-hop production to EDM resulting in the creation of STATIK LNK.

Career in EDM 

In 2012 during a tour stop in Chicago promoting "STATIK LNK The EP," Josh was introduced to trap music. Trap music, primarily known for its hip-hop roots, consists of Electro sounding instruments, vocal samples, and hip-hop drums.  Fascinated with the sound of trap music, Josh began work on STATIK LNK's new project concentrating primarily on the growing EDM trend of trap music. Using the hip-hop sound that he was well respected for during his hip-hop days, Josh would string together a hit of trap music remixes leading up to his debut release. While working on STATIK LNK's debut Trap EP, Josh released tracks that experienced major success. His first trap remix of Zomboy’s "Here To Stay" was critically acclaimed. The remix resulted in a top Trap Remix title being awarded to STATIK LNK for May 2013 by DJCity.com, the most popular DJ Pool in the USA [4]. The remix of "Here To Stay" was followed up with the success of STATIK LNK's remix of Kaskade's single "Atmosphere" which went viral over the internet resulting in a top hit among Kaskade Trap Remixes across the Internet. Josh continued to work on STATIK LNK's debut Trap EP while touring the US.  While working on his debut EP, Josh stayed in contact with MING.  Upon completion of the EP, Josh submitted the work to Hood Famous Music, MING's label imprint. During this time, MING had been experiencing major success with his debut release on DIM MAK, King Kong The EP. MING had also begun production in trap music. His work resulted in two Top 10 Beatport charting singles ("Rock", by Paul Mendez at #2 and "Colossal" by Fortune Cookie at #5 on the Beatport Hip Hop charts). Impressed by one of the productions on the album Josh had submitted, MING partnered with STATIK LNK to produce the anthem "Block Party" ft Moxiie. The critically acclaimed single experienced much success resulting in a Top 100 post on iTunes and a top 10 post on Beatport. Following the success of "Block Party",
STATIK LNK released their 1st major label remix of Australian recording artist Bonny Anderson for Sony Music in 2014 [8]. The remix was featured on Australian artist Bonnie Anderson (singer)'s EP "Blackout."

In August 2014, STATIK LNK signed with Bass Music label "Dirty Duck Audio." Dirty Duck Audio, known for its work with UK Trap artist Gold Top, released STATIK LNK's 3 track EP on September 8, 2014, via Beatport exclusive. The EP contains 3 new original works titled "Clap When She Walkin," "Get Down (Dat Azz)," and "Xposed Ft Big J Tha White Wonder." The EP featured Big J Tha White Wonder who also frequents STATIK LNK's original productions. The EP was critically acclaimed and received support from EDM.com (9). The EP debuted at number 22 on the Beatport hip-hop charts (10).

On January 12, 2015, STATIK LNK and Dirty Duck Audio partnered to release the "100HRTZ (The Remixes)" EP on Beatport (11). The EP featured remixes from Grammy-nominated producer Ming (DJ), Haterade (DJ), Instant Party! (DJ), Trentino (DJ), Jelo (DJ), Stuart Software (DJ), and a special VIP Mix from STATIK LNK. The EP was critically acclaimed and received support from EDM.com, Trapsounds, YourEDM, and many other prominent EDM sites and blogs.

After a 5-year career in dance music, STATIK LNK announced Dan Dwyer was leaving the group. In a Facebook post made by STATIK LNK (14), the group explains that Dan was leaving due to personal reasons, and Josh was taking control of STATIK LNK. In the same announcement, Josh explained that he was returning to live instrumentation and changing the direction of the music to focus more on funk, soul, and jazz sounds.

Current career 

Following the announcement of Dan's departure, Josh took two years off to focus on rebranding the sound of STATIK LNK. During this time he would release some remixes and music on his Audiomack and SoundCloud page. However, it wasn't until January 2019, that he released a full-length album titled "Into The Inferno, Vol.1". The project featured eight, short, jazz, ambient, and electronic-infused tracks. Following the release of "Into The Inferno, Vol 1", he would release the "Shapes Of Music, Vol 1", in February 2019, pulling from a pallet of Jazz, funk, and soul instrumentation, with hip-hop-inspired percussion. The project, known for its unique sound, blending the genres of Soul, Funk, and Jazz, was well received. The project was featured on the website Tracklib, marking STATIK LNK's introduction to the sample creation industry.

As of 2022, STATIK LNK has switched focus to creating library music, presets for musical plugins, and creating digital tools for musicians to use to create music. His projects can be downloaded to sample via Tracklib  and is consistently a top performer on the site.

Formation Of Onza Records 

In late 2018, STATIK LNK formed the boutique label, "Onza Records", to concentrate on the release of music that he describes as "forward-thinking music." The label releases music that is created using live instrumentation within the Hip-Hop, Soul, and Jazz genres. Onza Records projects are primarily instrumental. After their release, the records are made available to sample on Tracklib.

Discography

Solo albums
"MrSinister'" (Onza Records) (June 2022)
"Infinite'" (Onza Records) (April 2022)
"Opulence'" (Onza Records) (March 2022)
"Midnight'" (Onza Records) (February 2022)
"Daily Bread'" (Onza Records) (January 2022)
"renaissance'" (Onza Records) (October 2021)
"Cruisin'" (Onza Records) (September 2021)
"Replicants" (Onza Records) (September 2021)
"Into The Inferno, Vol 2." (Onza Records) (Aug 2020)
"Shapes Of Music, Vol.3" (Onza Records) (Jun 2020)
"Shapes Of Music, Vol.2" (Onza Records) (Jun 2019)
"My Beautiful Heartbreak" (Onza Records) (May 2019)
"Shapes Of Music, Vol 1" (Onza Records) (Feb 2019)
"Into The Inferno, Vol.1"(Onza Records) (Jan 2019)

Solo EPs
"Horizons"(Onza Records) (Mar 2020)
"No Shame" (Eq Distro/Onza Records) (Nov 2019)
"Eyes Closed" (Eq Distro/Onza Records) (Sept 2019)
"Renaissance" (Statik Link Music) (March 2016)

Singles

 Open Your Eyes (with Termanology and  Freddie Black) (2020)
 Block Party (with Ming (DJ) and Moxiie) (2013)
 Just Stay Rockin (with Johnny Labs) (Late 2013)
 Dro (Original Mix) (2014)
 Boss Sh*t Ft Mighty High Coup (Original Mix) (2015)
 The Don (Original Mix) (2015)
 About That (Original Mix) (2015)
 Something Different (Original Mix) (2015)
 #Bounce (Original Mix) (2015) 
 Cut Like A Razor Ft Drbblz x Tovr and Roc $ir Real (Original Mix) (2015)
 Black Lotus (Original Mix) (2015)
 So Obvious (Original Mix) (2016)
 Kick Tha Funk(Original Mix) (2016)
 Bring Tha Funk Back (Original Mix) (2016)

Remixes
 Spectrum (Statik Link Dubstep Remix) (with Zedd) (2012)
 Hello (Statik Link Dubstep Remix) (with Stafford Brothers, Lil Wayne, and Christina Milian) (2013)
 Here To Stay (Statik Link Trap Remix)  (with Zomboy) (2013) 
 Atmosphere (Statik Link Trap Remix)  (with Kaskade) (2013)
 Mastodon (Statik Link Trap Remix)  (with Milk N Cookies) (2014)
 Bang Bang (Statik Link Trap Remix)  (with Nancy Sinatra) (2014)
 (I Just) Died In Your Arms Tonight (Statik Link Trap Remix)  (with Cutting Crew) (2014)
 Blackout (Statik Link Trap Remix)  (with Bonnie Anderson (singer)) (2014)
 Lawnmower (Statik Link Trap Remix)  (with Aryay) (2014)
 Keep It 100 (Statik Link Twerk Remix)  (with Grandtheft) (2015)
 Bitch Better Have My Money (Statik Link Twerk Remix)  (with Rihanna) (2015)
 Jungle Ft Marty Baller (Statik Link Twerk and TJ Mizell Remix) (with ASAP Ferg) (2015)
 My Pony (Statik Link Remix) (with Ginuwine) (2016)
 I Like It Like That (Statik Link Trap Remix) (2018)

References

1.  "Beatport DJs." Beatport. 22 Nov 2013. Beatport LLC. <http://dj.beatport.com/statiklink>. 
2. Skilling, David. "Urban Hit Promotions." Interview With Statik Link. 22 Nov 2013.Urban Hit Promotions. <http://urbanhitpromotions.com/interview-with-statik-link/>. 
3.Torres, Carla. "MusikBeats." Statik Link. 29 Apr 2013.  MusikBeats LLC.<http://www.musikbeats.com/statik-link>.
4. DjCity DJs. "DjCity.com." Music Trends. 30 Jan 2013.  DJCity, INC. <http://www.djcity.com/trends>.
5. Albano, Aaron. "Hood Famous Music." MING, Statik Link, Moxiie – Block Party (Original Mix) . 30 Sep 2013.  Mings Music Enterprises, LLC. . <http://hoodfamousmusic.com/2013/09/ming-statik-link-moxiie-block-party-original-mix/>.
6. Dj Gigahurtz. "Soundcloud.com." Gigahurtz - Power 106 Jump Off Mix September 2013. 27 Oct 2013. <https://soundcloud.com/djgigahurtz/gigahurtz-power-106-jump-off>.
7. Eat Sleep EDM. "EatSleepEDM.com." Statik Link-Ounce Of Dat. 30 Aug 2013.  Eat Sleep EDM. <http://eatsleepedm.com/statik-link-ounce-dat/>. 
8. Sony Music Australia SoundCloud. "Sony Music Australia." Blackout Remixes. 27 Jun 2014.  Sony Music. <https://soundcloud.com/sony-music-australia/blackout-johnny-labs-statik-link-trap-club-mix-teaser>. 
9. EDM.com. "Statik Link." "EDM.com." 8 Sept 2014. <www.trapmusic.net>, <www.moombahton.net>
10. Beatport. "100 HRTZ." Beatport.com. 8 Sept 2014. <http://www.beatport.com/release/100-hrtz/1366355>.
11. Beatport. "100 HRTZ (The Remixes)." Beatport.com. 12 Jan 2015. <http://www.beatport.com/release/100-hrtz-the-remixes/1444375>.
12.  Beatport. "Primitive." Beatport.com. 30 Jun 2015. <https://pro.beatport.com/release/primitive/1553991>
13. Vibe Magazine. "A$AP Ferg And Marty Baller Find The Jungle Energy On Jungle (Remix)" Vibe.com. 18 Sept 2015. <http://www.vibe.com/2015/09/asap-ferg-mary-baller-jungle-remix/>.
14. Facebook. "Verified Page Post" facebook.com. 15 July 2016. <https://www.facebook.com/statik.link/posts/1499310876761007>.
14. The Music Ninja. ThemusicNinja.com. 24 May 2017. <http://www.themusicninja.com/electronic-statik-link-carpe-momentum-lp/>.
15. Instagram. "Verified Page Post" Instagram.com. 27 June 2019. <https://www.instagram.com/p/BzOFhxLl6fk/>.
15. Facebook. "Verified Page Post" Instagram.com. 6 Jan 2020. <https://www.facebook.com/STATIKLNK/?ref=your_pages>.

Musical groups from Ohio
People from Sandusky, Ohio
Musicians from Toledo, Ohio
Musical groups from New York City